Pont-y-Gilfach (or Pont y Gilfach) is a small village in the  community of Henfynyw, Ceredigion, Wales, which is 70.1 miles (112.8 km) from Cardiff and 184.4 miles (296.7 km) from London. Pont-y-Gilfach is represented in the Senedd by Elin Jones (Plaid Cymru) and is part of the Ceredigion constituency in the House of Commons.

References

See also
List of localities in Wales by population

Villages in Ceredigion